The Lady Who Lied is a 1925 American silent melodrama film produced and distributed by First National Pictures and based on a novel by Robert Hichens. Edwin Carewe directed, and Nita Naldi, and Lewis Stone star. The film has the distinction of being the feature attraction of the gala opening of the Uptown Theatre in Chicago, Illinois, on August 18, 1925.

Plot
As described in a film magazine review, Fay Kennion becomes engaged to Horace Pierpont, but breaks the engagement when she sees the young woman Fifi in a negligee in Horace's Venice hotel apartment. She goes to Beni-Mora in the Sahara where, to spite her former lover, she marries Dr. Alan Mortimer, who had long been in love with her. Horace follows her and, when Fay learns that the woman in the apartment in Venice had been trying to blackmail him, their friendship is renewed. Horace takes Fay and her husband on a trip across the desert. Alan's suspicions are aroused and, when Horace is bitten by a snake, he refuses to provide medical aid until he learns the truth about the relations between his wife and her former lover. They both lie at first, but then Horace insists on telling the truth before allowing Alan to save him from death from the snakebite. The former lovers separate, and the husband and wife start back towards Beni-Mora. While in route they are waylaid by desert bandits who kill Alan, leaving Fay free to follow her heart with Horace.

Cast

Preservation 
With no prints of The Lady Who Lied located in any film archives, it is a lost film.

References

External links

Lantern slide(Wayback Machine)
Compass Rose Cultural Crossroads

1925 films
American silent feature films
Lost American films
First National Pictures films
Films based on British novels
Films directed by Edwin Carewe
1925 drama films
American black-and-white films
Silent American drama films
Melodrama films
1925 lost films
Lost drama films
1920s American films